George Albert Tootill (29 October 1913 – 29 July 1984) was an English footballer who played as a defender. During his career he played for Plymouth Argyle, Sheffield United and Hartlepool United. He played his last match in 1947 for Hartlepool.

References

1913 births
1984 deaths
People from Walkden
English footballers
Hartlepool United F.C. players
Sheffield United F.C. players
Plymouth Argyle F.C. players
English Football League players
Association football defenders